Diatoxanthin is a type of xanthophyll found in phytoplankton and diatoms.

Carotenoids
Alkyne derivatives
Cyclohexenes